Mohamed Nazzal al-Armouti (16 July 1924 – 19 August 2015) was a Jordanian civil servant, diplomat and politician. He was governor of several of the Governorates of Jordan between 1955 and 1961. He later served as Interior Minister between 1964 and 1965. Subsequently, he was the Jordanian ambassador to Algeria, Kuwait, Libya and Tunisia.

Career
Al-Armouti was born on 16 July 1924 in Amman. He went to school in Amman and Al-Salt, and he later studied at Damascus University in Syria and the University of Exeter in the United Kingdom, obtaining a bachelor of law in 1946. In 1948 al-Armouti became secretary general of the Interior Ministry of Jordan. He held several other functions in the bureaucracy before starting a string of governorships between 1955 and 1961, including Hebron, Irbid, Karak, Ma'an, Nablus and Salt.

In 1961 he became under-secretary at the Interior Ministry. He was Interior Minister between 1964 and 1965. Immediately after his term as minister he became the Jordanian ambassador to the three North African countries Algeria, Libya and Tunisia, in which capacity he served in 1965. Between 1967 and 1971 he was Jordan's ambassador to Kuwait. After a stint as head of the political department of the Ministry of Foreign Affairs he subsequently retired in 1971.

He was also Chairman of Jordan Gulf Bank.

Al-Armouti died on 19 August 2015.

References

1924 births
2015 deaths
Ambassadors of Jordan to Algeria
Ambassadors of Jordan to Kuwait
Ambassadors of Jordan to Libya
Ambassadors of Jordan to Tunisia
Jordanian civil servants
Interior ministers of Jordan
People from Amman